Jan-Olof Strandberg (9 September 1926 – 2 May 2020) was a Swedish stage and film actor. He appeared in 45 films since 1947. On stage one of his most famous parts was as Vladimir in Samuel Beckett's Waiting for Godot, at Sweden's Royal Dramatic Theatre (where he performed 85 parts over the years).

He appeared in Erland Josephson's play Blomsterplockarna ("The Flower Pickers") at Dramaten in 2006-2007, performed the part of Andrew in A. R. Gurney's play Kärleksbrev (Love Letters) at Dramaten, opposite Anita Björk in 2009.

Selected filmography
 In the Arms of the Sea (1951)
 House of Women (1953)
 Wild Birds (1955)
 Last Pair Out (1956)
 A Dreamer's Journey (1957)
 Ön (1966)
 Varning för Jönssonligan (1981)
 Flight of the Eagle (1982)
 Resan till Melonia (1989)
 Faithless (2000)

References

External links

1926 births
2020 deaths
Eugene O'Neill Award winners
Male actors from Stockholm
Swedish male film actors